The Other Russia of E. V. Limonov, formerly The Other Russia, is an unregistered National Bolshevik political party in Russia, founded on 10 July 2010 by Eduard Limonov. The Other Russia was reorganized in September 2020 and changed its name to  "The Other Russia of E. V. Limonov", in honor of their deceased founder who had died the same year.

History

Origins 
The Other Russia was established on 10 July 2010 by former members of the banned National Bolshevik Party during their congress in Moscow.  On 21 January 2011, The Other Russia was denied registration by the Federal Registration Service because they did not have enough popular support among the Russian people.

Activity 

In 2010, three members of the party were arrested and beaten for their role in the Manezhnaya Square riots. These arrests were flagged by human rights organizations as politically motivated by the members' involvement in The Other Russia.

Since 2014, National Bolsheviks members of The Other Russia participated in pro-Russian unrest in Donbas. Members of the party formed armed troops Interbrigades and two members of The Other Russia were killed during the war in Donbas.

On 6 November 2017, several party's activists were arrested in Saint Petersburg for unauthorized protest as they commemorated the Bolshevik Revolution centenary.

On 7 February 2018, Kirill Ananiev, a veteran member of the banned National Bolshevik Party and The Other Russia, was killed in the air strikes during the Battle of Khasham.

On 22 September 2018, the special congress of the Other Russia party was held in Moscow. Eduard Limonov and another leaders gave their speeches. The congress was attended by delegates from regional branches of the party. Beness Aijo participated as representative of the armed forces of Novorossiya.

During the International Security Exhibition in Moscow on 26 October 2018, The Other Russia activist Olga Shalina cut her veins in act of symbolic protest against human rights violations in Russian penitentiary system. Shalina spoke about conditions in Russian prisons and spread leaflets criticizing police, shouting "Freedom for prisoners!"

Eduard Limonov died on 17 March 2020 in Moscow. In September 2020, The Other Russia was re-organized and changed the party's name to  "The Other Russia of E. V. Limonov", to honor their deceased founder.

Notable members 
 Eduard Limonov
 Andrei Dmitriev
 Beness Aijo
 Aleksandr Averin

See also 
 National Bolshevik Party
 Popular Resistance Association
 National Bolshevism
 The Other Russia (coalition)
 Strategy-31
 Russo-Ukrainian War

References

External links
  The Other Russia - official site.
  The Other Russia official blog.
  The Other Russia on Twitter.
  .
  Total Mobilization. Official organ of The Other Russia.
  In Ukraine, foreigners fight for socialism and Greater Russia. An interview with national-Bolshevik Beness Aijo, member of The Other Russia.

Political organizations based in Russia
2010 establishments in Russia
2014 pro-Russian unrest in Ukraine
Communist parties in Russia
Far-left political parties
Far-left politics in Russia
Far-right political parties in Russia
Left-wing nationalist parties
National Bolshevik parties
Nationalist parties in Russia
Opposition to Vladimir Putin
Political parties established in 2010
Right-wing parties in Europe
Russian irredentism
Russian nationalist parties
Syncretic political movements
Right-wing politics in Asia
Eduard Limonov